Amartya Bhattacharyya is a filmmaker, writer and artist from eastern India. He was awarded the Silver Lotus (Rajat Kamal) for the Best Cinematography in non-feature film at the 63rd National Film Awards by the president of India for his fantasy documentary 'Benaras-the unexplored attachments'. His second feature film 'Khyanikaa - The Lost Idea' featured as the only Odia film in the Indian Panorama section of 48th International Film Festival of India 2017. He was awarded the State film awards in Best Editing category for Khyanikaa - The Lost Idea at the 29th Odisha State Film Awards, conferred by the Government of Odisha. 

Amartya's latest feature film is Adieu Godard, which premiered at the 43rd Moscow International Film Festival 2021. The film is in Odia language and is an Indo-French co-production.

He is an independent film director, a surreal poet, writer, actor, editor, lyricist and a cinematographer. Amartya's artworks are mostly surreal, dark in concept, and psychoanalytic in nature. He himself tags his films as 'Psychodrama'.

Personal life 
Amartya Bhattacharyya was born in a Bengali Hindu family on 21 August 1987 in Kolkata. He is a Bachelor's in Technology graduate in Information Technology from Techno India College of Technology in 2009. He also works in a multinational IT company as a Technology Lead. Though born in a Hindu family, he is a non-religious person, who draws inspiration from various religions and ideologies. He is an apolitical person, and a strong critic of his socio-political environment.

Amartya's entry to the world of art was through an artist in Kolkata, Shri Siddhartha Mukherjee, who was the art teacher in his school 'The Modern Academy' where he studied for ten years till the completion of his secondary education. It was under his guidance that Amartya started experimenting with art forms at a very tender age, and developed a habit of challenging the conventions. Amartya also performed on stage for the first time at the age of six. Thereafter, he keenly pursued his interest in acting on stage throughout his school life. He was also a passionate cricketer at 'The Sunil Gavaskar Foundation for Cricket in Bengal'.

Film career
Capital I, Amartya's debut feature film happens to be the first independent feature film of Odisha. It featured in festivals like the South Asian Alternative Film Festival Paris, International Film Festival of Kerala, Bengaluru International Film Festival, etc. It is the first Indian film to be acquired by the Italy-based sales and distribution company ‘The Open Reel’. The film is being broadcast through the Poland-based TV channel ‘Filmbox Arthouse’.

Amartya's second feature film 'Khyanikaa - The Lost Idea' screened at around 30 international film festivals and across 14 countries. He won the state award for the Best Editing for Khyanikaa at the 29th Odisha State Film awards 2019. After making two feature films 'Capital I' and 'Khyanikaa' in Odia, he made his third feature film 'Runanubandha - The HE without HIM' in his mother tongue Bengali and shot in the city he was born and brought up in - Kolkata. Runanubandha - The HE without HIM, which derived its name from an Indian spiritual context, was a part of festivals like Moscow International Film Festival, Jogja-NETPAC Asian Film Festival, Oakland International Film Festival, Kolkata International Film Festival amongst others. 

Before making his debut feature film 'Capital I', Amartya had made few short films. His shots were a part of several international film festivals across the world, and bagged a number of awards in all categories.

Other activities 
Apart from films, Amartya is also the author of two books – 'Ekush (21)' and 'Shatarupa' which are compilations of his poems on love, death and the dark sides of human nature. The books were launched at the Kolkata International Book Fair in 2011 and 2012 respectively. His poems have also been published in several compilations and he was a regular writer/poet for a former weekly Bengali magazine named 'Anahoto'.

Filmography

Feature films

Non-feature Films

References

External links
Amartya Bhattacharyya at the INternet Movie Database

1987 births
Living people
Cinematographers from West Bengal
Film directors from Kolkata